Norman C. Melvin III (born July 11, 1950) is a botanist and plant ecologist.

Education and career
In South Carolina, Melvin graduated in 1973 from Presbyterian College with B.S. in biology and in 1976 from Clemson University with M.S. in botany. In 1980 he received his Ph.D. in botany from Ohio's Miami University. From 1980 to 1990 he was an associate professor of biology and chair of the biology department at St. Andrews Presbyterian College in North Carolina. From 1990 to 1995 he was employed in Laurel, Maryland as a State Plant Ecologist by the USDA's Natural Resource Conservation Service (NRCS). From 1995 to 2004 he was a botanist/plant ecologist at the NCRS Wetland Science Institute (which the NRCS created in 1994). While he worked at the Wetland Science Institute, he was also an adjunct professor at both the University of Maryland, College Park and Johns Hopkins University in Baltimore. In 2004 the NCRS underwent reorganization and replaced the Wetland Science Institute by the Wetland Technology Development Team (located in Fort Worth, Texas). In 2004 Melvin was appointed the Leader of the Wetland Technology Development Team and held the appointment until he retired in March 2018. As Team Leader, he served as the national representative of the NCRS on issues related to the botany and ecology of wetlands.

Selected publications

References

1950 births
Living people
20th-century American botanists
21st-century American botanists
Plant ecologists
Presbyterian College alumni
St. Andrews University (North Carolina) alumni
Miami University alumni
United States Department of Agriculture people